Atal Bihari Vajpayee Government Institute of Engineering and Technology is an engineering college run by the government of Himachal Pradesh, in Pragatinagar, Shimla district. It is affiliated to Himachal Pradesh Technical University (HimTU) and is approved by AICTE (2012).

History
Atal Bihari Vajpayee Government Institute of Engineering & Technology was established on 10 April 2011.

References

Memorials to Atal Bihari Vajpayee
Engineering colleges in Himachal Pradesh
Education in Shimla district
Educational institutions established in 2011
2011 establishments in Himachal Pradesh